Glendale (Wiyot: p'lèta-kawèti "rocks-white" ) is an unincorporated community in Humboldt County, California.

References

Unincorporated communities in Humboldt County, California
Unincorporated communities in California